John Mawdley or Maudelyn (by 1467 – 9 August 1540) of Wells, Somerset, was an English politician.

Family
Mawdley married a woman named  Joan, whose maiden name may have been Attwater. They had at least two sons, one of which, John Mawdley, was an MP for Wells, and one daughter.

Career
He was a Member (MP) of the Parliament of England for Wells in 1510 and 1523.

References

15th-century births
1540 deaths
People from Wells, Somerset
English MPs 1510
English MPs 1523